Anne Neuberger (born 1976) is an American national security official who serves as the deputy national security advisor for cyber and emerging technology in the Biden administration. Prior to this role, she served for over a decade at the NSA, as director of cybersecurity, as assistant deputy director of operations and as the agency's first chief risk officer. She joined the federal government as a White House fellow, working at the Pentagon, and subsequently served as deputy chief management officer of the Navy, before joining NSA. Before entering government service, Neuberger was senior vice president of operations at American Stock Transfer & Trust Company.

Early life and education 
Neuberger grew up in Brooklyn, New York, and in 1997, she received a BA from Lander College for Women of Touro College. In 2005, she graduated from Columbia University with an MBA and master of international affairs (MIA) in operations management, international affairs, security policy, Persian Gulf. She was also selected as a White House fellow. Neuberger grew up in the Hasidic community of Boro Park in Brooklyn, New York City.

Career 
Anne Neuberger worked in the private sector in various technology roles, where she was responsible for directing and automating financial sector operations, and overseeing the acquisition and integration of Wachovia's custody and trust operations. She entered government as a White House Fellow in 2007, working for the Secretary of Defense and then served as Deputy Chief Management Officer of the Navy.

Neuberger joined the National Security Agency (NSA) in 2009 where she has held key leadership positions such as leading NSA's cybersecurity mission, including emerging technology areas like quantum-resistant cryptography. Previously, she co-led NSA and USCC's election security effort and led NSA's intelligence operations, leading an organization of over 20,000 people globally. Neuberger also served as Director of NSA's Commercial Solutions Center and served as NSA's first Chief Risk Officer, building NSA's enterprise risk management program.

In 2017, she was awarded a Presidential Rank Award.

In 2019, General Nakasone formed the NSA's Cybersecurity Directorate and named Neuberger as the first Director of Cybersecurity. The directorate focuses on "preventing and eradicating" cyber threats from countries such as Russia, China, Iran, and North Korea.

In 2020, she was awarded the DoD Distinguished Civilian Service Award and NSA's Distinguished Service Medal, DOD's and NSA's highest civilian awards.

Neuberger left her role as NSA's Director of Cybersecurity in April 2021 after becoming President Joe Biden's Deputy National Security Advisor for Cyber and Emerging Technology and joining the National Security Council.

Personal life
Neuberger's grandparents are Holocaust survivors, and her parents were among the passengers on the hijacked Air France flight in 1976, rescued by Israeli commandos in Operation Thunderbolt from Uganda's Entebbe Airport. Neuberger is also the founder of a nonprofit organization, Sister to Sister, that serves single Jewish mothers across the United States. She serves on the board of Bridging Voice and JDC.

References 

American people of Hungarian-Jewish descent
1976 births
Living people
National Security Agency people
American Hasidim
Satmar Hasidim
American Orthodox Jews
White House Fellows
School of International and Public Affairs, Columbia University alumni
United States Deputy National Security Advisors